Jim Tait (November 6, 1935 – May 20, 2011) was an American football player, coach, and college athletics administrator.  He was head football coach at the University of Richmond from 1974 until 1979, compiling a record of 21–44. In 1975, Richmond won the Southern Conference championship. Tait was fired after the 1979 season, and then hired by Virginia Tech as an assistant athletic director under Bill Dooley.  Tait was a native of New Rochelle, New York.  He played college football at Mississippi State University and began his coaching career there in 1957.  He died on May 20, 2011 in Richmond, Virginia.

Head coaching record

College

References

1935 births
2011 deaths
American football halfbacks
Mississippi State Bulldogs football coaches
Mississippi State Bulldogs football players
Richmond Spiders football coaches
Virginia Tech Hokies athletic directors
High school football coaches in Mississippi
Sportspeople from New Rochelle, New York
Players of American football from New York (state)